John Cathcart Wason (17 November 1848 – 19 April 1921), generally known as Cathcart Wason, was a Scottish farmer and politician who served as a Member of Parliament in two countries: first in New Zealand and then in Scotland. He established Barrhill, a model village, and after the failure of this colonial venture, he returned to Scotland.

Early life

Born in Colmonell near Girvan, South Ayrshire, he was the son of Rigby Wason and his wife Euphemia McTier. Rigby Wason was a barrister and a successful farmer who converted much of his Corwar estate from moor to arable land; he had also served as a Member of Parliament. He was educated at Laleham and at Rugby School. He came to Canterbury in New Zealand in 1868.

Cathcart Wason had four siblings; three older brothers (Rigby, Eugene and James) and one younger sister (Catherine Rigby). Peter Cathcart Wason was Eugene's grandchild.

New Zealand

Corwar and Barrhill

Lendon was a  run on the south bank of the Rakaia River on New Zealand's South Island, about 17 km from the town of Rakaia. The land was first taken up by John Hall, but had changed ownership several times before Wason bought it, including  of freehold land, in February 1869 or April 1870 (sources vary). Wason renamed his property Corwar after his father's lands in Scotland, and set about trying to create a model estate.

On the estate, Wason built a model village called Barrhill, approached from the north, east, south and west by avenues lined respectively with sycamores, birches, poplars and oaks. At the centre was a market square, with post office, bakery and other facilities and fifteen cottages were built.

However, Wason had expected a railway to be built near Barrhill, but when it was built on a more southerly route, the village began to decline. Dwindling population forced the closure of the school in 1938, although the Church of St John the Evangelist is still in use. Most of the buildings were constructed from pine wood grown on the estate, and all that remains now are the three concrete buildings: church, school and schoolhouse, each surrounded by a circle of oak trees.

Without the railway, Wason saw his project as doomed, and sold up in 1900. The mansion was burned down soon after and all that remains is the gate lodge, now the home of the Corwar Lodge Museum, displaying artefacts of the colonial era.

New Zealand political career

 

 

 

Wason was elected to the House of Representatives in the 1876 election on 11 January for the electorate (constituency) of Coleridge, and was appointed as a government whip the following year. On 14 April 1879, he resigned his seat in Parliament, as well as his membership on the Ashburton County Council.

Wason stood for election in the newly formed Wakanui electorate in the 1881 general election. The 9 December election was contested by Wason, Joseph Ivess and Charles Purnell. Wason won by a small margin, and Ivess petitioned against the election on numerous grounds. The election petitions court started hearing the case in February 1882. Members were sworn into the 8th New Zealand Parliament on 18 May 1882 for its first session; Wason was not present. On the following day, the results of the various election petitions were read out, and the 1881 Wakanui election was declared void. Wason lost his seat in Parliament without having ever taken it. The resulting 16 June 1882 by-election was won by Ivess.

Wason did not stand again until the 1893 general election, when he ran unsuccessfully in the Ashburton electorate. He was elected as MP for Selwyn in the 1896 election on 21 December. That parliamentary term finished on 15 November 1899 and that is when Wason retired from politics in New Zealand.

Politics ran in the Wason family. His father Rigby was an MP for Ipswich (1831–37) before Cathcart was born, and his brother Eugene represented two UK constituencies (South Ayrshire and Clackmannanshire and Kinross-shire) at various times between 1885 and 1918.

Travel

Wason travelled overseas on several occasions, marrying Alice Seymour Bell, in Sydney, Australia, on 18 June 1873. In 1886 was he elected a fellow of the Royal Geographical Society in London, and in 1887 he followed his father and brother and was called to the Bar at the Middle Temple, but did not practise.

Return to Scotland

Wason sold his New Zealand estate in 1900 and returned to Scotland, where he was elected as Liberal Unionist MP for Orkney and Shetland in the 1900 general election, and bought a house in London and a property in Ayrshire not far from the original Corwar. He resigned his seat on 7 October 1902 and successfully stood for re-election in the 1902 by-election as an Independent Liberal. He was re-elected as a member of the Liberal Party in the subsequent general elections in 1906, January 1910, December 1910 and 1918. He continued to sit as MP for Orkney and Shetland until his death.

His brother Eugene was chairman of the Scottish Liberal MPs from 1908 to 1918.

Cathcart Wason lived at Grosvenor Road when in London. He was a member of the Viking Club. He died in London on 19 April 1921 aged 72, survived by his wife. He is believed to have had no children.

Publications

; later re-published in revised form as "The Beast".

Notes

References

External links

 Canterbury-West Coast: Barrhill-Corwar Lodge Preservation Society contact details

|-

|-

|-

1848 births
1921 deaths
People educated at Rugby School
People from South Ayrshire
Anglo-Scots
Liberal Unionist Party MPs for Scottish constituencies
Members of the Parliament of the United Kingdom for Orkney and Shetland
Scottish farmers
Scottish emigrants to New Zealand
Scottish Liberal Party MPs
Fellows of the Royal Geographical Society
People from Mid Canterbury
New Zealand MPs for South Island electorates
Members of the New Zealand House of Representatives
Unsuccessful candidates in the 1884 New Zealand general election
Unsuccessful candidates in the 1893 New Zealand general election
UK MPs 1900–1906
UK MPs 1906–1910
UK MPs 1910
UK MPs 1910–1918
UK MPs 1918–1922
19th-century New Zealand politicians